Acmaeodera pubiventris is a species of metallic wood-boring beetle in the family Buprestidae. It is found in Central America and North America.

Subspecies
These four subspecies belong to the species Acmaeodera pubiventris:
 Acmaeodera pubiventris lanata Horn, 1880
 Acmaeodera pubiventris panocheae Wescott, 2001
 Acmaeodera pubiventris pubiventris Horn, 1878
 Acmaeodera pubiventris yumae Knull, 1937

References

Further reading

 
 
 

pubiventris
Articles created by Qbugbot
Beetles described in 1878